Viktor Nikitovich Lisitsky (born 18 October 1939) is a retired Russian gymnast. He competed in all artistic gymnastics events at the 1964 and 1968 Summer Olympics and won five silver medals, three individual in 1964 and two with the Soviet team, in 1964 and 1968.

At the European championships Lisitsky won three titles in 1965 (rings, vault and pommel horse), three in 1967 (rings, vault and horizontal bar), and one in 1969 (horizontal bar), and finished second five times. At the World championships, he only won two team silver medals, in 1962 and 1970. Domestically, he won 15 Soviet titles (1964 and 1966 in individual all-around; 1964–65, 1967, 1969-70 in floor exercise, 1965 and 1968 on rings, 1964-66 on vault and 1966–67, 1969 on horizontal bar). After retiring from competitions, he coached gymnastics at his Army Sports club in Moscow. He then was appointed as professor and head of the physical education department of Mendeleyev Russian University of Chemistry and Technology. Lisitsky is an avid painter and is a member of the Union of Russian Artists.

References

1939 births
Living people
Russian male artistic gymnasts
Soviet male artistic gymnasts
Olympic gymnasts of the Soviet Union
Gymnasts at the 1964 Summer Olympics
Gymnasts at the 1968 Summer Olympics
Olympic silver medalists for the Soviet Union
Olympic medalists in gymnastics
Medalists at the 1968 Summer Olympics
Medalists at the 1964 Summer Olympics
Medalists at the World Artistic Gymnastics Championships
European champions in gymnastics